{{DISPLAYTITLE:C16H24N4O2}}
The molecular formula C16H24N4O2 (molar mass: 304.387 g/mol) may refer to:

 Dipropylcyclopentylxanthine
 Tracazolate

Molecular formulas